Eric L. Santner (born 1955) is an American scholar. He is Philip and Ida Romberg Professor in Modern Germanic Studies, and Chair, in the Department of Germanic Studies, at the University of Chicago, where he has been based since 1996. A graduate of Oberlin College in 1977, Santner received his doctorate at the University of Texas at Austin, in 1984, then going on to teach at Princeton University.

Santner's writing covers literature, psychoanalysis, religion, and philosophy. It deals with German poetry, post-war Germany, and the Holocaust. His 2001 book On the Psychotheology of Everyday Life: Reflections on Freud and Rosenzweig tackles the question of religious tolerance using the work of the Jewish religious philosopher Franz Rosenzweig.

Works
Friedrich Hoelderlin: Narrative Vigilance and the Poetic Imagination (1986)
Stranded Objects: Mourning, Memory and Film in Postwar Germany (1990)
My Own Private Germany: Daniel Paul Schreber's Secret History of Modernity (1996)
On the Psychotheology of Everyday Life: Reflections on Freud and Rosenzweig (2001)
Catastrophe and Meaning: The Holocaust and the Twentieth Century (2003) editor with Moishe Postone.
The Neighbor: Three Inquiries in Political Theology (2005) with Slavoj Žižek and Kenneth Reinhard 
On Creaturely Life: Rilke, Benjamin, Sebald (2006)
The Royal Remains: The People's Two Bodies and the Endgames of Sovereignty (2011)

Notes

External links
Faculty and Staff , Department of Germanic Studies, University of Chicago

1955 births
Living people
University of Chicago faculty
University of Chicago Department of German faculty
Professors of German in the United States
Date of birth missing (living people)
Place of birth missing (living people)
Oberlin College alumni
University of Texas at Austin alumni
Princeton University faculty
Germanic studies scholars